Cuore di cane (International title - Dog's Heart) is a 1976 joint Italian-German comedy film directed by Alberto Lattuada based on a novel Heart of a Dog by Mikhail Bulgakov adapted by Mario Gallo. Screenplay by Alberto Lattuada with Viveca Melander. Composer - Piero Piccioni, editor - Sergio Montanari. Cinematography by Lamberto Caimi. Production companies - Corona Filmproduktion, Filmalpha, distribution by Constantin Film. Runtime - 113 min.

Cast
 Max von Sydow as Professor Filipp Filippovich Preobrazenski
 Eleonora Giorgi as Zina
 Mario Adorf as Dr. Bormenthàl
 Gina Rovere as Darja
 Cochi Ponzoni as Poligràph Poligràphovic Bobikow
 Vadim Glowna as Schwonder
 Rena Niehaus as Zoja
 Enzo Robutti as Il commissario
 Violetta Chiarini as Vjazemskaja
 Amerigo Tot as Il portiere
 Vlado Stegar
 Ilona Staller as Natasa
 Giuliano Petrelli as Sarovkjam
 Jean-Claude Vernè
 Piero Tordi
 Howard Nelson Rubien
 Samuel Lachize
 Maria Pia Attanasio as Pelageja
 Adolfo Lastretti as Il giudice
 Giancarlo Anichini
 Attilio Dottesio
 Veriano Genesi
 Neil Hansen
 Franco Mazzieri as L'oste
 Gennaro Ombra
 Alessandro Tedeschi

See also
Heart of a Dog (1988 film), Russian TV adaptation of the same novel.

External links
 

1976 films
1970s fantasy films
Italian fantasy films
West German films
1970s Italian-language films
Films directed by Alberto Lattuada
Films based on works by Mikhail Bulgakov
Films based on Russian novels
Films set in the Soviet Union
Films set in the 1920s
Constantin Film films
1970s Italian films